The 1927 San Diego mayoral election was held on April 5, 1927 to elect the mayor for San Diego. Incumbent mayor John L. Bacon did not to stand for reelection. In the primary election, Harry C. Clark and Percy J. Benbough received the most votes and advanced to a runoff election. Clark was then elected mayor with a majority of the votes in the runoff.

Candidates
Harry C. Clark, attorney
Percy J. Benbough, mortician
George L. Mayne
Claude L. Chambers
Edgar F. Hastings
Byron J. Walters
William I. Kinsley
Alfred L. Lee
Oriel C. Jones

Campaign
Incumbent Mayor John L. Bacon chose not to stand for reelection to a third term, leading to a large field of competitors to replace him. On March 22, 1927, Harry C. Clark came in first place in the primary election with 30.2 percent of the votes, followed by Percy J. Benbough with 17.0 percent. Since no candidate received a majority of the vote, Clark and Benbough advanced to a runoff election. On April 5, 1927, Clark received a majority of 61.3 percent of the vote in the runoff and was elected to the office of the mayor.

Primary Election results

General Election results

References

1927
1927 in California
1927
1927 United States mayoral elections
April 1927 events